Tauriel is a fictional character from Peter Jackson's feature film adaptation of J.R.R. Tolkien's The Hobbit. The character does not appear in the original book, but was created by Peter Jackson, Philippa Boyens, and Fran Walsh as an expansion of material adapted from the book. She  appears in the second and third films in that trilogy, The Hobbit: The Desolation of Smaug and The Hobbit: The Battle of the Five Armies.

She is a Woodland Elf whose name has been translated as "Daughter of the forest", and is the head of the Mirkwood Elven guard. She is played by Canadian actress Evangeline Lilly, who was nominated for several awards for her performance in The Desolation of Smaug, with some of the stunt work performed by Australian stuntwoman Ingrid Kleinig.

Appearances
The character of Tauriel was created for the films, having no equivalent character in the original novel. She first appears in the second film of the trilogy, The Desolation of Smaug, released December 13, 2013. Prior to the decision to have three films instead of two, Tauriel was described as having a more substantial role in what was then the final film, The Hobbit: The Battle of the Five Armies, which had been planned for release in 2013, but was finalized as the third part of the trilogy, which was released in December 2014.

In The Desolation of Smaug, the hobbit Bilbo Baggins, and thirteen dwarves, while traveling to Lonely Mountain, pass through the black forest of Mirkwood, where they are attacked and captured by giant spiders. The spiders are then attacked by the Wood Elves, led by Legolas and Tauriel. Tauriel in particular saves Kíli by killing two spiders that attacked him, but the Elves subsequently take the dwarves as prisoners for trespassing on their land.

It is later mentioned that Tauriel is a talented warrior and was therefore made leader of the Mirkwood border guards. Legolas, the son of Mirkwood's Elven king Thranduil, is indicated to be attracted to her, but as she is a lowly Silvan Elf, she does not believe herself worthy of him. Thranduil, in fact, makes it clear that he does not consider her to be a suitable match for his son and warns her not to give Legolas false hope.

During the dwarves' imprisonment, Tauriel forms a romantic bond with Kíli. When the dwarves escape with Bilbo's help, the pursuing Elves are attacked by orcs, during which Tauriel again uses her fighting skills to save Kíli, though Kíli is struck in the leg with an orc's arrow, which Tauriel later learns from a captured orc is a Morgul-cursed weapon that will slowly kill him. Just before Thranduil seals off his kingdom upon learning that an evil entity has returned and is amassing great power in the south, Tauriel goes after the dwarves. Legolas follows, and initially tries to convince her to return, but when Tauriel refuses, saying that the Elves are part of Middle-earth and will be drawn into this inevitable war, Legolas joins her pursuit.

After acquiring provisions at Esgaroth, the dwarves leave for the Lonely Mountain. Kíli, Fili, Bofur and Óin stay behind, with Kíli suffering from the effects of the poison. By the time Tauriel and Legolas reach Esgaroth, the dwarves are being attacked by orcs. They repel the invaders, and Tauriel uses her knowledge of herbs and elvish medicine to heal Kíli's wound, saving his life once again.

In The Hobbit: The Battle of the Five Armies, during Smaug's attack on Esgaroth, Tauriel and the dwarves facilitate the evacuation of Bard's family, though Bain leaves their company and helps Bard kill Smaug. The following morning, as the dwarves set out for Erebor to rejoin their company, Kíli asks Tauriel to come with them, but her duties with Legolas forces them to part. When a messenger from Thranduil arrives to announce her banishment from the Mirkwood Realm for disobeying his orders, she joins Legolas in investigating the old fortress Gundabad, where they witness the departure of an army led by Bolg to join the forces of his father Azog marching against Erebor.

Hurrying towards the mountain, the two Elves arrive in the thick of the Battle of the Five Armies. When Tauriel witnesses Thranduil attempting to leave the battlefield, with the intent of sparing his people further bloodshed, she accuses him of turning away and abandoning the dwarves to be slaughtered. Thranduil states that the dwarves are fated to die, as they are mortal and thus the timing of their demise does not matter. Tauriel then nocks an arrow; pointing it at Thranduil as she queries him whether he believes his life is more valuable than those of dwarves, and proclaims that he is devoid of love. Thranduil, dismissing the notion that Tauriel's regard for Kíli is genuine love, destroys her bow and threatens her life. However, he backs down when his son Legolas intervenes saying, "If you harm her, you will have to kill me." Learning that Kíli had joined Thorin's pursuit of Azog, she and Legolas hurry to Azog's command post, the Ravenhill, to aid the dwarves.

Running to find Kíli, Tauriel is intercepted and brought to her knees by Bolg. Before the Orc can strike the fatal blow, however, Kíli intervenes on her behalf, and Bolg kills him instead. In retaliation, Tauriel tackles Bolg, throwing him and herself off a ruined platform onto the rocks beneath, thus leading to Bolg's final battle with Legolas, who kills Bolg. Following the resolution of the battle, Thranduil finds Tauriel weeping over Kíli's body, acknowledging that her feelings for the young dwarf were indeed genuine.

Conception and casting
In 1937 J. R. R. Tolkien published the fantasy novel The Hobbit, whose plot centres on a group consisting of the titular Bilbo Baggins, Gandalf the wizard and thirteen dwarves, who go in search of a treasure guarded by the dragon, Smaug. During the course of their travels, they enter the black forest of Mirkwood, where they find themselves in the dungeons of the Silvan Elves. During the climactic Battle of Five Armies at the end of the story, the dwarves, men and elves band together to fight an army of goblins and Wargs.

Although the character Tauriel does not appear in this story, she was created to be the head of the Elven guard by Peter Jackson and his writing partners Philippa Boyens and Fran Walsh (who is also Jackson's wife and producing partner) in order to expand the world of the elves of Mirkwood Forest, and to bring another woman to the cast, which is otherwise dominated by men. The character  Tauriel is a Silvan Elf, which means she is of a much lower order than the elves that had previously been seen in The Lord of the Rings film series, and holds a lower social status than characters like Arwen, Galadriel, Elrond, and Legolas. A Woodland Elf, her name has been translated as "Forest Daughter."

In June 2011 Peter Jackson announced that actress Evangeline Lilly, who was known for her portrayal of Kate Austen in the ABC television drama Lost, was cast in the role. Lilly, who had been a fan of Tolkien's books since she was 13, expressed some trepidation at the reaction of Tolkien purists to a character that does not appear in Tolkien's written works, but stated that creating the character for the adaptation was justified: "I believe she is authentic, because Tolkien refers to The Woodland Elves, he just doesn't talk about who they are specifically… [Peter and Fran] know that world so well. They’re not going to create a character that is not true to Tolkien's world." Nonetheless, following the June 12, 2013 release of the first trailer for the film, some fans expressed dissatisfaction with the creation of a character that did not originate in the source material.

As head of the Elven guard, Lilly says of Tauriel, "She's slightly reckless and totally ruthless and doesn't hesitate to kill." Lilly also describes Tauriel as a nonconformist, explaining that as a result of her relative youth among Elves, she is brash and impulsive, tending to rebel against the established social order of the Elves.  Lilly explains, "She's only 600 years old, she's just a baby. So she's a bit more impulsive, and she's a bit more immature. I think she's more easily romanticized by a lot of things." Alluding to Tauriel's pursuit of the dwarves in The Desolation of Smaug after Thranduil closes his kingdom's borders and forbids any interference on the part of Elves in outside affairs, and her refusal to fight alongside him in The Battle of the Five Armies, Lilly explains, "In a very out of character move for an elf, she's broken ranks and disobeyed authority. That's driven from her own conviction about what is right and what is wrong. She feels so much at odds with Thranduil, that she feels the need to defy him. I think that any defiant role that boxes authority is an easy fit for me, because in life I'm a little bit like that."

However, Tauriel also has a "softer side", and her character arc includes a love story. Though she and Legolas first met as children, and their relationship is significant, her romantic arc is not with him, as she develops a mutual attraction to the dwarf Kíli. Legolas' father, the Elven king Thranduil, is fond of Tauriel, and "sees something very special in her", though she understands that Thranduil would not approve of her pairing with his son, which Thranduil confirms in The Desolation of Smaug when he tells her not to give Legolas false hope of such a relationship. Lilly accepted the role under the condition that her role in The Hobbit would not include a love triangle. When she was called back into production for reshoots following the decision to split the story into three films instead of two, she was told that such a plot device would indeed be added to the story.

Filming of Tauriel's scenes began in September 2011 in New Zealand, and was expected to last a year. Lilly stated that she enjoyed the relaxed atmosphere of the set, and the familiar experience of filming with a male-dominated cast, which was reminiscent of her work on Lost and The Hurt Locker. Lilly employed a language coach in order to effect the Elvish language.

In addition to the red wig she wore to effect Tauriel's knee-length red hair, Lilly, when given a choice of wearing small, medium or large prosthetic ears, chose the large ones, which are three times the size of the prosthetics Orlando Bloom wore as Legolas, though Lilly believed that the length of her hair would distract attention from the ears. In terms of costuming, unlike previous female Elves who were noblewomen that wore complex formal gowns, Tauriel is a border guard and soldier, and therefore wears more pragmatic Elven military garb. The character is proficient in a variety of weapons, but mainly wields a bow and two daggers, weapons that are also used by the character Legolas, who also appears with her in The Hobbit films.

Lilly employed a stunt coach for action scenes. She noted that the experience of having had her first child in May 2011 made aspects of filming the fighting scenes more strenuous than expected, commenting, "Recovering from labor is like recovering from a full-body injury, and I didn't realize to what extent that was true until I started training for elf fighting. My hips don't move like they used to move, my back doesn't move like it used to move, my shoulders are sore every day. But it's fun." Although Lilly requested to do the character's wirework herself, on account of her experience doing her own stunts on Lost, that work was performed by Lilly's stunt double, Australian stuntwoman Ingrid Kleinig.

Merchandising
Tauriel is part of Lego set No. 79001 titled Escape from Mirkwood Spiders, together with minifigures of Legolas and the Dwarves Fíli and Kíli, and set No. 79016 titled Attack on Lake-Town, with minifigures of Bard, Bain, and two Hunter Orcs.

Reception and cultural impact
For her performance as Tauriel, Evangeline Lilly was nominated for the Saturn Award for Best Supporting Actress, the Broadcast Film Critics Association Award for Best Actress in an Action Movie, the Empire Award for Best Supporting Actress, and the 2014 Kids' Choice Awards.

In an article written in The Huffington Post, Clarence Haynes compared Tauriel to Katniss Everdeen from The Hunger Games, describing both of them as archetypical embodiments of the ancient Greek goddess Artemis. Michael O'Sullivan of The Washington Post, in his review of The Desolation of Smaug, welcomed Tauriel's addition to the set of characters and called her "a sort of pointy-eared Lara Croft".

Shaun Gunner, Chairman of the Tolkien Society, praised the inclusion of Tauriel as "the biggest gem and missed opportunity of this film" stating that she provides "a strong and warm voice in the story" but that the writers "were wrong to cheapen the character by putting her in a love-triangle". Fan reaction to Tauriel's appearance in The Hobbit films, and to other changes made by Jackson in adapting Tolkien's book for the screen, were parodied in the song and video "Who the 'ell is Tauriel?" by The Esgaroth Three.

In Mad magazine's parody of The Desolation of Smaug, writer Desmond Devlin emphasized the similarity of the setting in which actress Evangeline Lilly's character was placed with that of her character on Lost, with her statement, "I can't believe I'm back in another weird forest, fighting random threats and making random alliances on a vague and poorly-defined mission. I thought I was done with that stuff when they cancelled Lost!" Devlin, who had begun a running joke of alluding to Legolas (called Legolamb in the parody) being effeminate in the magazine's parodies of the original Lord of the Rings trilogy, also used Tauriel to return to that gag, as well as referencing Tauriel's lack of canonicity.

See also

List of original characters in The Hobbit film series

References

External links
 Tauriel on IMDb
"Dish Of Salt: Evangeline Lilly Dishes On Filming ‘The Hobbit’". (Video of Evangeline Lilly speaking Elvish) Access Hollywood. October 2011

Fictional archers
The Hobbit (film series)
Film characters introduced in 2013
Middle-earth Elves
Characters in The Hobbit
Fantasy film characters
Fictional women soldiers and warriors